The Murphy JDM-8 is a Canadian single-seat ultralight monoplane designed by Daryl Murphy. The type was intended to be sold as a kit for home construction by Murphy Aircraft of Chilliwack, British Columbia.

The designation indicates the designer's initials, J. Daryl Murphy and his eighth design.

Design and development
Work was begun on the JDM-8 design in December 1998, but the project was not a high priority and so did not fly until March 2001. The aircraft was first publicly shown at Sun 'n Fun 2000 when it was not yet complete.

The JDM-8 is an all-metal low-wing cantilever monoplane designed in two variants, one to meet the American FAR 103 Ultralight Vehicles regulations and one for the non-American markets particularly Canada and Europe. The JDM-8 has a conventional landing gear with a tailwheel and can be powered by a Rotax engine from 20-80HP. An unusual feature is the upwards folding wing for storage and transportation.

The fuselage of the JDM-8 is of semi-monocoque aluminum construction. The  fuel tank is located in front of the instrument panel. The conventional main landing gear for the ultralight version is bungee suspended and includes brakes, while the main landing gear of the homebuilt version is of a sprung design. The tail wheel spring is of 4140 steel and incorporates an inline skate wheel.

The wing aft of the D-cell is covered in aircraft fabric and has a modified NACA 4415 airfoil with a drooped trailing edge. The 11 nose ribs and nine aft wing ribs are made from hydroformed aluminum.

The ultralight version has an ultimate load limit of +5/-2.7 g and an operational limit of +3.8/-1.8g, while the homebuilt version has an ultimate limit of +5.7/-5.7g and an operational limit of +3.8/-3.8 g.

The kit supplied for the JDM-8 was intended to include the parts to make both versions and the manufacturer claimed a construction time from the kit of 800 hours.

The completed prototype JDM-8 was displayed at Sun 'n Fun in April 2004, but due to the introduction in the US of the light-sport aircraft category at the same time, no orders were forthcoming and by 2008 the aircraft was no longer listed as being available by Patterson AeroSales, the manufacturer's sole sales agent.

Operational history
In January 2011 there were two JDM-8s registered in Canada, one a basic ultralight and the other an advanced ultralight, both owned by the manufacturer.

Variants
US ultralight version
Homebuilt version

Specifications (FAR-103 Variant)

See also

References

Notes

2000s Canadian civil utility aircraft
Homebuilt aircraft
Low-wing aircraft
Single-engined tractor aircraft
Aircraft first flown in 2001
JDM-8